Bob Arnot, M.D., internal medicine, is a journalist, author, former host of the Dr. Danger reality TV series, and previously medical and foreign correspondent for NBC and CBS.

Books
 The Aztec Diet, HarperCollins 
 The Best Medicine, Addison Wesley
 The Breast Cancer Prevention Diet, Little Brown
 Turning Back the Clock, Little Brown
 Revolutionary Weight Control, Little Brown
 The Prostate Cancer Prevention Plan, Little Brown
 The Biology of Success, Little Brown
 The Breast Health Cookbook, Little Brown
 Beating Wear and Tear, Simon & Schuster
 How to Prevent a Heart Attack, Simon & Schuster
 Sport Selection with Charles Gaines, Viking
 Your Survival, Hatherleigh
 The Coffee Lover's Diet, HarperCollins

Television
 Foreign correspondent. NBC and MSNBC. 2001–2004
 Medical correspondent, Dateline NBC, Today, NBC Nightly News, 1996-2000
 Medical correspondent, CBS News, CBS Evening News, 48 Hours, CBS This Morning, 1984-1996
 Dr. Danger

Columnist and writer
 Men's Journal
 Vanity Fair

Humanitarian aid
 Founder and chairman of Lifeline Iraq
 Co-founder of American Working Group on Greater Syria
 Past or present board member for:
 Save the Children
 UN High Commission for Refugees (USA)
 Artists for Peace and Justice
 US Committee for Refugees
 Lindberg Foundation

References

External links
 

Living people
NBC News people
American television reporters and correspondents
Year of birth missing (living people)
Place of birth missing (living people)